The Buena Vista Hills are a mountain range of the Transverse Ranges System, located in western Kern County, California.

They are on the southwestern edge of the San Joaquin Valley, near the site of the former Buena Vista Lake.

References 

Mountain ranges of Kern County, California
Geography of the San Joaquin Valley
Transverse Ranges
Hills of California
Mountain ranges of Southern California